The tanager finch (Oreothraupis arremonops) is a songbird species. In spite of its common name, it is neither a tanager nor a finch, but a New World sparrow, having been moved to that family after variously being placed in either the Emberizidae or the true tanager family Thraupidae. It is the only species in the monotypic genus Oreothraupis.
It is found in Colombia and Ecuador, where its natural habitat is subtropical or tropical moist montane forests. It is threatened by habitat loss.

References

tanager finch
Birds of the Colombian Andes
Birds of the Ecuadorian Andes
tanager finch
tanager finch
Taxonomy articles created by Polbot